Crambus caligula is a moth in the family Crambidae. It was described by Stanisław Błeszyński in 1961. It is found in the Democratic Republic of the Congo, Ethiopia and Uganda.

References

Crambini
Moths described in 1961
Moths of Africa